Tommy Tobar (born 21 November 1986 in Colombia) is a Colombian footballer who now plays.

Career

Tobar started his senior career with Pumas de Casanare. After that, he played for Millonarios, Bogotá, Deportes Palmira, Pacífico, Cúcuta Deportivo, Sucre, Cortuluá, Atlético Bucaramanga, Patriotas Boyacá, Nacional Potosí, Al-Shamal SC, and Carabobo. In 2018, he signed for Al-Ittihad Kalba SC in the UAE Pro League, where he made twenty-eight appearances and scored seven goals.

References

External links
 Tommy Tobar: "The key has been at work"
 Tommy Tobar: from scorer to go cheated and without charging full in Carabobo FC
 Tommy Tobar, the scorer of San Andrés 
 Garnet Tommy Tobar: "I had to debut with a goal and we hope to continue like this"
 I want to keep contributing with a goal: Tommy Tobar
 'Tommynator', scorer of Bucaramanga, already has his sights set on Jaguares

1986 births
Living people
Colombian footballers
Colombian expatriate footballers
Bogotá FC footballers
Pacífico F.C. players
Cúcuta Deportivo footballers
Deportes Palmira players
Cortuluá footballers
Millonarios F.C. players
Association football forwards
Atlético Bucaramanga footballers
Al-Shamal SC players
Patriotas Boyacá footballers
Carabobo F.C. players
Nacional Potosí players
Al-Ittihad Kalba SC players
Emirates Club players
Categoría Primera A players
Categoría Primera B players
Venezuelan Primera División players
Qatari Second Division players
UAE Pro League players
UAE First Division League players
Bolivian Primera División players
Expatriate footballers in the United Arab Emirates
Expatriate footballers in Venezuela
Expatriate footballers in Qatar
Expatriate footballers in Bolivia